Ivo Karlović won the first edition of the tournament, defeating Alejandro Falla 6–3, 7–6(7–4) in the final.

Seeds

Draw

Finals

Top half

Bottom half

Qualifying

Seeds
All seeds, along with four other players, received a bye into the second round.

Qualifiers

Qualifying draw

First qualifier

Second qualifier

Third qualifier

Fourth qualifier

References
Main Draw
Qualifying Draw

Claro Open Colombia - Singles
2013 Singles